Ayisha Siddiqa (born 8 February 1999) is a Pakistani American climate justice advocate. She is the co-founder of Fossil Free University and Polluters Out.

Background and education 
Siddiqa was born on 8 February 1999. She was born in Jhang, which is located near the Chenab River and lived on her grandparents' farm around there as a young child. Her grandfather died as a result of blood cancer in 2012, and her grandmother passed away in 2014. She attributes her grandparents' deaths to the polluted river water that they consumed. Siddiqa moved to Coney Island, Brooklyn when she was a child. She graduated from Hunter College and received a Bachelor of arts in Political Sciences and English in 2021. While at Hunter College, she was part of the Thomas Hunter Honors program.

Career 
Siddiqa worked at the New York State Assembly as part of the Edward T. Rogowsky Internship program in 2019. From 2021-2022, she was a fellow at the Coro New York Leadership Center. She has also been a law fellow at Munger, Tolles & Olson. She continues her work as a climate justice advocate while also serving as a fellow at the Climate Litigation Accelerator (CLX), which is part of Earth Rights Advocacy at NYU Law.

Activism 
Siddiqa first became involved in climate activism when she launched her university's branch of extinction rebellion in May 2019. The organization held a strike on 7 October 2019 in Lower Manhattan, New York City. The strike included about 300,000 participants. As part of that protest, strikers doused fake blood on the Charging Bull, located on Wall Street.

In response to the 2019 United Nations Climate Change Conference, she founded Polluters Out with Isabella Fallahi and Helena Gualinga. The organization was created in response to the realization that fossil fuel  industries play a big role in the COPs. Fossil fuel companies who fund the COPs include Endesa, Iberdrola, Banco Santander and Acciona. As a result of this campaign, COP26 didn't include big oil companies as sponsors. British Petroleum was one such oil company denied sponsorship. Ayisha Siddiqa also joined the walkout at the TED Countdown Conference, which happened in Edinburgh in response to the speaker role given to Shell plc Chief Executive Officer, Ben van Beurden, and other fossil fuel executives. She is also the co-founder of Free Fossil University.

Siddiqa also attended the 2021 United Nations Climate Change Conference in November 2021, where she critiqued the inaccessibility of the COP, especially for people from the Global South.  In 2022, she was a very active participant in the youth delegation to the COP27 in Egypt. You can see her in action via her twitter account.

In March 2023, she was named as one of Time magazine's Women of the Year.

References 

Living people
1999 births
Youth climate activists
American people of Pakistani descent
American women environmentalists
People from Coney Island
Hunter College alumni
People from Jhang District